The Gold Blend couple was a British television advertising campaign for Nescafé "Gold Blend" instant coffee, developed by McCann Erickson and which ran from 1987 to 1993.

Background
The original campaign ran for twelve 45-second instalments between 1987 and 1993. It starred Anthony Head and Sharon Maughan as Tony and Sharon, a couple who begin a slow-burning romance over a cup of the advertised coffee. The ads were in a serial format, with each ending with a cliffhanger. The commercials were extremely popular, and as time went on, the appearance of a new installment gained considerable media attention. They are one of the most famous examples of serialized advertising.

Beginning in 1990, new versions of the ads were produced for the American market, where Gold Blend was called "Taster's Choice", and the ads were referred to as the "Taster's Choice saga". Head and Maughan reprised their roles (Tony being renamed Michael), but used American accents in the re-shot ads. After the first two nearly identical ads, the American ads diverged into their own storyline.

The campaign was a remarkable success, producing various tie-in products, including a novelization entitled Love Over Gold by Susan Moody, a video compilation of the ads, and two music CDs. The ads had a notable effect on sales, increasing them over 50% in the U.K. alone. They have been heralded as a premier example of positioning, creating an atmosphere of sophistication, while remaining relatable. They were frequently compared to a soap opera, even sometimes favourably compared to their contemporaries, such as Dynasty, Moonlighting, or thirtysomething. Famously, Head and Maughan appeared on the cover of The Sun after their campaign concluded and the two characters confessed their love for each other.

In later years, there were two additional series of ads starring new couples. The second series starred Louise Hunt and Mark Aiken and focused on a younger, more career-oriented woman, running for six instalments until 1997. In 1998, a new version with Simone Bendix and Neil Roberts began, but the campaign was discontinued after only one ad.

In 2005, the campaign ranked at number 20 on "ITV's Best Ever Ads". It had ranked at number 31 in a similar list compiled in 2000 aired on Channel 4.

See also
Bisto – television advertising for Bisto
Oxo – television advertising for Oxo

References

Other sources 

 
 
 
 
 

Advertisements
Advertising characters
Advertising campaigns
Mascots introduced in 1987
British television commercials
American television commercials